Denholm is a small village located between Jedburgh and Hawick in the Scottish Borders region of Scotland, UK. The estimated population of Denholm is 600. There is a village green in the centre. It lies in the valley of the River Teviot. Denholm is a Conservation Area listed as 'a planned village as opposed to the traditional unplanned or organic form of village usually found in Roxburghshire.'

The village of Denholm is situated in Teviotdale, about halfway between the towns of Hawick and Jedburgh. It lies in gentle rolling countryside between Rubers Law and the Minto Hills, volcanic outcrops which thrust up through the underlying Old Red Sandstone.

The original settlement of 'Denum' was sited 'at the valleys' where the broad valley of the River Teviot meets the narrow glen of the Dean Burn. The early hamlet was plundered and burnt during English raids of the 16th century. The village we see today dates from the 17th century when it was laid out around the Green.

The population of the village is 653 (in 2011).

History
The village is built around the Green, which in days gone by was let for grazing to the butchers or smallholders. In the middle of the Green stands Leyden's Monument, which was erected in 1861 in honour of Dr John Leyden (1775–1811), poet, antiquarian and orientalist, who was born in Denholm. The monument was designed by the architect Hector H. Orrock, and sculpted by Alexander Handyside Ritchie. The Green has always been at the heart of village life. Weekly and half-weekly fairs used to be held here. Part of the base of an old mercat cross can still be seen inside the railings surrounding the monument. The cross itself was removed and the base hollowed out sometime in the 19th century to make a water trough for cattle. Westgate Hall built in 1663 stands at the western approaches to the village.

In Main Street, stands The Text House, a category B listed building, erected about 1910 by John Haddon (1845–1924), a medical doctor and author of published works on public sanitation and dietetics. The 3-storey house is in the arts and craft style. One of the texts on the front elevation is a reminder to take care with time before it passes, "TAK TENT IN TIME ~ ERE TIME BE TINT", the other text reminds the occupier that there were and will be others living in the house, "ALL WAS OTHERS ~ ALL WILL BE OTHERS".

Council pre-fabs were put up in the Ashloaning at the end of the war followed by the "Crudens semis" and the "Orlits". During the 1950s, six more semi-detached houses were built in The Loaning and ten in Murray Place. All through the 1950s the public water supply was inadequate for the post-war village, but in 1963 a proper supply was finally piped in from Alemoor Loch above Roberton. The way was now open for more housing development. Like most villages, Denholm is expanding, and many new houses have been built in the past few years. Denholm Mill and Denholm Hall Farm have both been developed for housing, but the centre of the village around the Green is a conservation area.

Denholm was the only village in the civil parish of Cavers and is situated in the north-east corner of the parish.

See also
List of places in the Scottish Borders
List of places in Scotland

Famous sons of Denholm
Prof.Dr. William Lowrie Professor of Geophysics at the ETH Zurich (1974/2004). Fellow of the American Geophysical Union and member of the Academia Europaea. Author of the "Fundamentals of Geophysics" textbook.
James Duncan (entomologist)
Ainslie Henderson (b. 1979) Singer/songwriter
John Leyden Orientalist
James Murray (1837–1915), Philologist, primary editor of the  Oxford English Dictionary from 1879 until his death
Charles Oliver Murray (1842–1923), artist and printmaker, brother of Sir James Murray
John Scott (botanist) (1836–1880)
William Johnstone (artist) (1897–1981)

Gallery

References

External links

RCAHMS/Canmore record for Denholm, Westside Mill
RCAHMS record for Denholm, Teviot Bridge
SCRAN image of Former Corn Mill, Denholm
 Village website
 Four Denholm Scholars 
 Border Bogie Challenge
 John Ramsay's The story of Denholm in my boyhood days (1900)
 Inauguration of the Leyden Monument, 19 October 1861  

Eildon
Villages in the Scottish Borders